Arnold Jeannesson (born 15 January 1986 in Challans) is a French former road bicycle racer, who competed professionally between 2008 and 2017. He previously specialised in cyclo-cross and mountain biking. Jeannesson wore the white jersey of the highest placed rider under the age of 26 for two days in the 2011 Tour de France. In October 2015,  announced that Jeannesson would be part of their squad for 2016. Jeannesson announced in August 2017 that he would end his professional career on the road at the end of the season 2017.

Major results

Road

2007
 1st Stage 4 Tour de la Manche
2008
 1st Stage 3b Tour de la Manche
 3rd Overall Tour de l'Avenir
1st Stage 8
 6th Tour du Finistère
 6th Boucles de l'Aulne
 8th Grand Prix de Plumelec-Morbihan
2011
 3rd Tro-Bro Léon
 Tour de France
Held  after Stages 12–13
2012
 5th Overall Tour of Oman
 6th Overall Paris–Nice
2013
 5th Tour du Finistère
 10th Clásica de San Sebastián
2016
 4th Overall Critérium International
2017
 9th Overall Tour du Haut Var
2018
 1st  Overall Transmaurienne Vanoise

Grand Tour general classification results timeline

Cyclo-cross

2006–2007
 3rd National Under-23 Championships
2007–2008
 Challenge la France
3rd Cap d'Agde
2010–2011
 3rd National Championships
2011–2012
 1st Cyclo-cross International du Mingant Lanarvily
2012–2013
 1st Cyclo-cross International du Mingant Lanarvily
 2nd National Championships
2013–2014
 1st Sablé-sur-Sarthe
 Challenge la France
2nd Flamanville
2016–2017
 2nd National Championships
 Coupe de France
3rd Nommay
2017–2018
 3rd National Championships
 Coupe de France
3rd Flamanville

References

External links 

 
 Profile at team website

1986 births
Living people
Cyclists from Pays de la Loire
French male cyclists
Sportspeople from Vendée
Cyclo-cross cyclists